Melvin Douglas (born August 21, 1963) of Topeka, Kansas is an American wrestler who was the 1993 World Champion, and made six World championship teams for the United States, including appearances at two Olympic games, and was a two-time NCAA Division I Champion for the University of Oklahoma. In 2013, Douglas was inducted into the National Wrestling Hall of Fame as a Distinguished Member.

High school
In 1979, 1980 and 1981, Douglas won the Kansas state championship at Highland Park High School. Douglas also was a USA Junior Freestyle national champion in 1981 after his senior season of high school.

College
While at The University of Oklahoma Oklahoma, Douglas won the NCAA Division I Championship in 1985 and 1986 at 177 pounds and was an All-American (top eight finish) two other times at Oklahoma.

International
Douglas represented the United States in the FILA World Championships six times, and won the 1993 world championship at 90 kg. Douglas won silver in 1989 and third in 1994 and '95. Douglas competed in the 1996 Olympic Games in Atlanta where he placed seventh (with a 3–2 record) at 90 kg. He also qualified for the 2000 Games in Sydney, Australia at 97 kg, finishing in 18th Place with an 0–2 record.

References

1963 births
Living people
Olympic wrestlers of the United States
Wrestlers at the 1996 Summer Olympics
Wrestlers at the 2000 Summer Olympics
American male sport wrestlers
World Wrestling Championships medalists
Pan American Games medalists in wrestling
Pan American Games gold medalists for the United States
Wrestlers at the 1995 Pan American Games
Medalists at the 1995 Pan American Games
20th-century American people